Plumstead Common is a common and urban park in Plumstead in the Royal Borough of Greenwich (SE18), south-east London. It is part of the South East London Green Chain.

Location and geology 
Plumstead Common is bound to the north by Old Mill Road and to the south by Plumstead Common Road. To the east lies Winn or Winn's Common.

The common contains deposits of puddingstone, a conglomerate rock formed during a period of global warming 60 million years ago. The rock is more usually found north of the River Thames in Hertfordshire, see Hertfordshire puddingstone.

History 
Plumstead Common was first mentioned in the Domesday Book in 1086 ("Plumstede"). The name refers to a place where plums grow.

In the 19th century more and more common land was sold off to build houses for the growing workforce at Royal Arsenal. The arrival of the railways sped up this process. The people of Plumstead protested that they had the right to graze their livestock on the land of Plumstead Common and to use it for sports and recreation. In June 1876 these protests attracted the Irish activist John De Morgan who on 1 July led protestors up from Woolwich Arsenal to Edwin Hughes (leader of the conservative party) house tearing down illegally erected fences on their way. John De Morgan was arrested and sent to prison for seventeen days. The riots resulted in the 1878 Plumstead Common Act ensuring that one hundred acres of land remained as public open space forever.

Royal Arsenal F.C.'s first home was playing on the common.

Edwin Cross was the last known commoner to exercise the right of letting small cattle (goats) graze on Plumstead Common and neighbouring Woolwich Common in the 1970s.

Heritage buildings and cultural events 
Substantial remains of the Old Mill still stand and have been incorporated into the public house of the same name. Nearby is Plumstead Manor School. On the southwest corner of the common stands the former Prince of Wales pub.

Plumstead Common is the venue for the Plumstead Make Merry event, which is the longest-running community festival in the Royal Borough of Greenwich and is run on an voluntary basis by a group of people who are passionate about the local area. Plumstead Common is also the venue for the popular Asian Mela, which has been described as the "Asian Notting Hill Carnival".

Photo gallery

See also 
 Plumstead Common Windmill
 Winn's Common
 Woolwich cemetery

References

External links
 Plumstead Make Merry festival

Parks and open spaces in the Royal Borough of Greenwich
Common land in London